John P. Burke is an American politician who served in the Massachusetts Senate from 1979 to 1991. At the time of his election, he was the youngest senator to ever serve in a state senate, at the age of 24.

See also
 Massachusetts Senate's 1st Hampden and Hampshire district

References

Democratic Party Massachusetts state senators
Politicians from Holyoke, Massachusetts
Georgetown University alumni
Living people
1954 births